Sophie Carenco is a researcher at the French National Center for Scientific Research, working on nanochemistry at the Laboratory of Condensed Matter Chemistry of Paris. Her research focuses on novel synthetic routes of exotic nanomaterials for energy application such as CO2 capture.

Early life and education 
Sophie Carenco is from the city of Hyeres in France, and graduated from Ecole Polytechnique in 2008. She obtained her PhD in 2011 from Pierre and Marie Curie University in Paris, working on the synthesis and applications of metal phosphide nanoparticles. From 2012 to 2013, she was a post-doctoral fellow at Lawrence Berkeley National Laboratory in Berkeley, California, in Miquel Salmeron's group working on X-ray spectroscopy at the Advanced Light Source.

Research and career 
In 2014, she joined the French National Center for Scientific Research as a researcher in the team Hybrid Materials and Nanomaterials of the Laboratory of Condensed Matter Chemistry of Paris (LCMCP), associated with Sorbonne University and Collège de France, with a L'Oreal-UNESCO-Académie des Sciences Fellowship. In 2017, she was awarded an ERC Starting Grant to work on small molecules activation at the surface of nanoparticles.

Carenco's research during her undergraduate, graduate, and postdoctoral training was on the use of white phosphorus to synthesize nickel-containing nanoparticles which can be constructed into defined sizes,  and investigating the catalysis of reactions of nickel nanoparticles with alkynes, and nanoscaled reaction mechanisms with borides and phosphides.

Selected publications

Awards and honors 
She was awarded the European Young Chemist Award from the European Chemical Society in 2010 and the C'Nano National Award in 2012 for her PhD work. In 2018 she was awarded the Bronze Medal of the CNRS and the Jean Rist Medal.  In 2020, she received a Clara Immerwahr award from UniSysCat.

References

External links 

Living people
Year of birth missing (living people)
People from Hyères
École Polytechnique alumni
Pierre and Marie Curie University alumni
French National Centre for Scientific Research scientists
French women chemists
21st-century French women scientists